The Fairey Ferret was a 1930s British general-purpose biplane designed and built by the Fairey Aviation Company. It performed well in trials but was not ordered into production.

Development
The Ferret was designed to meet a Fleet Air Arm requirement defined by specification 37/22 for a reconnaissance aircraft; it was the company's first all-metal design. With a lack of interest from the FAA the company proposed the design to meet a Royal Air Force requirement for a general-purpose biplane.

The company built three prototypes, two were three-seaters (to meet the naval requirement) and the third was a two-seater. The two-seater Ferret III was also fitted with a new Fairey-designed high-speed gun mounting in the rear cockpit. The first prototype first flew in June 1925 powered by a 400 hp (298 kW) Armstrong Siddeley Jaguar IV radial engine. The other two aircraft had a nine-inch extension to the wingspan and both were fitted with a 425 hp (317 kW) Bristol Jupiter radial engine.

The aircraft performed well during trials at RAF Martlesham Heath but was not ordered into production.

Variants

Ferret Mk I
Three-seat prototype powered by a 400hp (298kW) Armstrong Siddeley Jaguar IVl radial engine, one built.
Ferret Mk II
Three-seat prototype powered by a 425hp (317kW) Bristol Jupiter radial engine, one built.
Ferret Mk III
Two-seat prototype powered by  a 425hp (317kW) Bristol Jupiter radial engine, one built.

Specifications (Ferret III)

See also

References

Notes

Bibliography

 

1920s British military utility aircraft
Ferret
Aircraft first flown in 1925